"Along for the Ride" is a power ballad by progressive rock/metal band Dream Theater, and is the second single from their self-titled 12th studio album. It was announced on the band's official Facebook page as the second single on September 6, 2013 and was made available in various locations on September 9. The band's guitarist John Petrucci, talked about the lyrics in an interview in which he said: "the message to that song is very much like you know with all the crazy stuff that happens in the world and all the dangerous events and people out there and things going on... that we don't have a lot of control for that, and then we're just on this big planet, and we're along for the ride". The world tour to promote Dream Theater is named after the song.

Track listing

Releases 
 CD-R, Single, Promo – Roadrunner Records, US,  September 9, 2013.

See also
List of Dream Theater songs

References

External links
Official Dream Theater website
Official Dream Theater Facebook page

2013 singles
Dream Theater songs
Roadrunner Records singles
Songs written by John Petrucci
Songs written by Jordan Rudess
2013 songs
2010s ballads
Heavy metal ballads